Love Is a Ball (released in the UK as All This And Money Too) is a 1963 romantic comedy film starring Glenn Ford, Hope Lange, and Charles Boyer. It is based on the novel The Grand Duke and Mr. Pimm by Lindsay Hardy.

Plot

Etienne Pimm has an unusual way of making a living: he arranges for impoverished European aristocrats to marry unsuspecting rich people. He is then discreetly compensated for his matchmaking. His latest target is Millicent "Milly" Mehaffey, newly arrived on the Riviera. Pimm and his assistant Janine begin grooming the penniless Grand Duke Gaspard Ducluzeau for Milly by hiring three men. Julian Soames is to teach him manners and English. As their target fancies herself a race car driver, Pimm recruits John Lathrop Davis, a (retired) champion many times over, to instruct Gaspard in the finer points of competitive driving. The third man is world-renowned chef Maurice Zoltan.

Pimm "accidentally" meets Milly's uncle and guardian, Dr. Christian Gump (Telly Savalas, cast against type as a cultured gourmet) and invites him to a dinner prepared by Zoltan. Gump cannot resist the bait of a meal prepared by a famous chef. After dinner, he is introduced to the handsome young duke, well prepared after weeks of intensive training. As Pimm had hoped, Gump begs him to bring the duke to a party he has arranged for Milly, confiding that he hopes they fall in love and that his troublesome ward will settle down.

Meanwhile, Priory, another of Pimm's minions, has gotten himself hired as the chauffeur to spy on the family. When an errant polo ball struck by Gaspard breaks Priory's arm, a reluctant Davis takes his place. Davis is openly contemptuous of Milly's unrealistic plan to compete in the International Grand Prix, clashing repeatedly with his spoiled employer. As they spend more time together though, her initial dislike turns into love.

With the romance between Milly and Gaspard not proceeding very well, Pimm suggests to Milly that the young couple spend a romantic night together at his private villa. She takes him up on his offer, only with Davis, not Gaspard.

The next morning, Milly learns the truth and is at first outraged, even though Pimm confesses that Davis was not the intended groom. For revenge, she decides to marry an oafish suitor named Freddie. However, on her wedding day, her grandmother Mathilda convinces her to reconcile with Davis. This is just fine with Gaspard, as he has fallen for Janine.

Cast
Glenn Ford as John Lathrop Davis
Hope Lange as Millicent "Millie" Mehaffey
Charles Boyer as Etienne Pimm
Ricardo Montalbán as Duke Gaspard Ducluzeau
Telly Savalas as Dr. Christian Gump
Ruth McDevitt as Mathilda
Ulla Jacobsson as Janine
Georgette Anys as Mme. Gallou
Robert Bettoni as Milkman
Mony Dalmès as Mme. Fernier
Laurence Hardy as Priory
Jean Le Maitre as Carlo
André Luguet as Maurice Zoltan
Jean Parédès as Freddie
Redmond Phillips as Starcy
Erika Soucy as Gretl
Aram Stephan as Gallou
Olga Valéry as Mme. Giardin
John Wood as Julian Soames
Jean-Pierre Zola as Mueller

Production
The novel was published in 1959. Rights were bought by Martin H. Poll of Gold Medal Enterprises; Poll owned Gold Medal Studios in the Bronx, facilities which were hired out to movie makers. He had decided to move into film production. The screenplay was originally written by the author of the novel.

Blake Edwards was originally attached to direct. Glenn Ford and Hope Lange were signed to star early on. Eventually David Swift came in to write and direct. Ulla Jacobsson signed to make her American debut with the film.

The film was shot on the French Riviera. Glenn Ford and Hope Lange were a real-life couple at the time.

The film had its world premiere at Las Vegas.

Reception
Bosley Crowther, critic for The New York Times, panned it, writing that "If 'Love Is a Ball,' somebody fumbled." He found it "predictable nearly every step of the way" and "laboriously arch in tone, broadly played in general and directed with slapdash aimlessness by Mr. Swift." He noted that the "sun-kissed scenery, though, should set anyone drooling". He mentioned the "determined, good-natured attitude of a game cast headed by Glenn Ford, Hope Lange and Charles Boyer", and in particular found Montalban and Jacobsson "entirely disarming."

Lindsay Hardy, author of the novel and of the earlier radio serial The Knave of Hearts upon which the novel was based, disliked the film. Hardy stated that the film "bore no relation to the book whatever—plot gone, people gone. You would never know there had ever been a book. What makes the movie men tick I cannot understand. They buy a story, get A, B, C, and D to write various screenplays from it, and then shoot a movie about something else entirely. So what  are  you to make of them? It was in colour and looked very pretty...but apart from that it had nothing and was not too well received. Not that it made a scrap of difference to me. I had been paid and the money handed over to doctors and hospitals long before it ever appeared on the screen. In my last letter to Marty Poll [the producer] I asked him why, oh why Marty-boy, do you bother to buy books at all? He hummed and hawed."

See also
List of American films of 1963

References

External links

1963 romantic comedy films
1963 films
American romantic comedy films
1960s English-language films
Films scored by Michel Legrand
Films based on Australian novels
Films directed by David Swift
Films set on the French Riviera
Films shot in France
United Artists films
1960s American films